"Open Sesame" is a song by Swedish Eurodance artist Leila K, released in October 1992 as the lead single from her second album, Carousel (1993). Co-written and co-produced by Denniz PoP, it was a huge success in many European countries in 1993. It reached number-one in Belgium and peaked within the top 10 in at least nine other countries. In 1999, the song was released in a new remix as "Open Sesame '99". Dutch singer Daisy Dee released a cover in 2000, which reached number 78 in Germany.

Critical reception
In his weekly UK chart commentary, James Masterton felt that "this high-powered commercial rap coupling a rave beat with a ragga style delivery may just revive her career." Andy Beevers from Music Week gave the song four out of five, writing, "This commercial Swedish house track combines a Felix-style tune and reggae toasting. The UK release features a more adventurous remix by Felix himself." Mark Sutherland from Smash Hits gave it three out of five, saying, "Ragamuffin rapping in a Swedish accent may sound like a thoroughly appalling notion, but Ms K goes for it with such pzazz that you soon come round to the idea. This girl has more energy than Linford Christie after a Lucozade binge, and this record is a real Sesame treat."

Chart performance
"Open Sesame" was successful on the charts across Europe. It reached number one for one week in Belgium (Flanders), with a total of 16 weeks at the Ultratop 50 chart, and number two in the Netherlands. In the latter, the song held the next best chart position for several weeks, being held off the top spot by 2 Unlimited's "No Limit". It entered the top 10 also in Austria (5), Denmark (7), Finland (9), Germany (5), Italy (5), Portugal (7), Spain (6) and Switzerland (5). In the UK, the single reached number 23 on the UK Singles Chart, but was more successful on the UK Dance Singles Chart, peaking at number ten in January 1993. In Leila K's native Sweden, it only reached number 21, staying at Sverigetopplistan for three weeks. On the Eurochart Hot 100, it hit number six in April 1993, while peaking at number 12 at Music & Medias European Dance Radio Chart and number 18 on Music Weeks Record Mirror Club Chart.

The single earned a gold record in the Netherlands with a sale of 50,000 units.

Music video
The accompanying music video for "Open Sesame" was directed by Swedish-based director Matt Broadley. It received heavy rotation on MTV Europe and was later published on Mega Records' official YouTube channel in December 2011. The video had generated more than 5,7 million views as of December 2022.

Track listings

 12-inch, UK and Europe (1992)
A1: "Open Sesame" (long version)
A2: "Open Sesame" (short version)
AA1: "Open Sesame" (Felix remix)
AA2: "Open Sesame" (Bouncing Baby mix)

 CD maxi, Europe (1992)
 "Open Sesame" (radio edit) – 3:24
 "Open Sesame" (long version) – 8:43
 "Open Sesame" (instrumental) – 4:00

 CD maxi – Remixes, Scandinavia (1992)
 "Open Sesame" (Bouncing Baby mix) - 3:39
 "Open Sesame" (Felix remix) – 5:22
 "Sesame Music" – 9:16

 CD maxi - Final Exit Remix, Germany (1993)
 "Open Sesame" (Final Exit remix) – 5:34
 "Open Sesame" (Last Exit mix) – 4:22
 "Open Sesame" (Plutonic mix) – 10:54

 CD maxi, Scandinavia (1999)
 "Open Sesame '99" (X-2000 radio) – 3:43
 "Open Sesame '99" (X-2000 extended) – 6:29
 "Open Sesame '99" (Fix & Trix extended) – 7:50
 "Open Sesame '99" (Soundfreak remix) – 3:48
 "Open Sesame '99" (Sezams Uber Alles remix) – 5:28
 "Open Sesame '99" (Fatz-Jr remix) – 4:59
 "Open Sesame" (original full length version) – 8:49

Charts

Weekly charts

Year-end charts

Sales and certifications

Release history

References

1992 singles
1992 songs
English-language Swedish songs
Leila K songs
Music videos directed by Matt Broadley
Polydor Records singles
Song recordings produced by Denniz Pop
Songs written by Denniz Pop